"I'd Love You to Want Me" is a song by American singer-songwriter Lobo. It was released in September 1972 as the second single from his second album Of a Simple Man.

The song was Lobo's highest charting hit on the Billboard Hot 100 chart, where it spent two weeks at No. 2 in November (behind "I Can See Clearly Now" by Johnny Nash). The single was the second of four of his songs to hit No. 1 on the Easy Listening chart, where it had a one-week stay at that top spot in December 1972. It became a gold record.

When released in the United Kingdom in 1972, the song failed to reach the UK Singles Chart; however, a re-release of the single in 1974, on the UK record label, peaked at No. 5.

The song also topped the music charts in at least seven nations, including Australia (Kent Music Report, two weeks), Canada (RPM Magazine, one week), and Germany (Media Control Charts, 13 weeks in 1973-1974).

Cover versions 
Many artists have covered the song. Among the most notable are the following:
Dutch singer Dennis Jones (born Casper Janssen), covered it with Dutch lyrics titled "De Zon Die Zal Schijnen"; it stayed five weeks on the Dutch Single Top 100 chart in 2008, peaking at No. 48. The CD single also included a German version, "Du Bist Nicht Alleine", and the original English version "I'd Love You To Want Me".
Brazilian pop trio KLB released a Portuguese version of the song in 2000, titled "Ela Não Está Aqui".
Dutch-Spanish singer Tony Ronald released a cover and also a spanish version of the song, titled "Tú Sabes Que Te Amo".

Chart performance

Weekly charts

Year-end charts

See also
List of number-one singles in Australia during the 1970s
List of RPM number-one singles of 1972
List of number-one hits of 1973 and 1974 (Germany)
List of number-one adult contemporary singles of 1972 (U.S.)

References

1972 singles
Lobo (musician) songs
Songs written by Lobo (musician)
Cashbox number-one singles
Number-one singles in Australia
Number-one singles in Austria
Number-one singles in Germany
RPM Top Singles number-one singles
Number-one singles in New Zealand
Number-one singles in South Africa
Number-one singles in Switzerland
1972 songs
Big Tree Records singles
UK Records singles